Victor Koretzky (born 26 August 1994) is a French cross-country mountain biker and road cyclist, who currently rides for UCI WorldTeam . He won the junior cross-country world championship in 2011. Competing with the French team he won the cross-country team relay world championship in 2011, 2015, and 2016.

Koretzky represented France in cross-country mountain biking at the 2016 Summer Olympics in Rio de Janeiro, Brazil.

His brother Clément Koretzky is also a cyclist.

Major results

Cyclo-cross

2011–2012
 3rd National Junior Championships
2014–2015
 3rd National Under-23 Championships
2015–2016
 Coupe de France
1st Flamanville
2nd Quelneuc
 2nd National Under-23 Championships
2016–2017
 Coupe de France
3rd Bagnoles de l'Orne

Mountain Bike

2011
 UCI World Championships
1st  Team relay
1st  Junior cross-country
2012
 UCI World Championships
2nd  Team relay
2nd  Junior cross-country
2015
 UCI World Championships
1st  Team relay
2nd  Under-23 cross-country
 1st Roc d'Azur
2016
 UCI World Championships
1st  Team relay
2nd  Under-23 cross-country
 1st  Cross-country, National Under-23 Championships
2017
 Copa Catalana Internacional
1st Banyoles
2018
 Copa Catalana Internacional
1st Banyoles
1st Barcelona
 2nd Cross-country, National Championships
2019
 1st  Cross-country, National Championships
 French Cup
2nd Marseille
2nd Levens
 Copa Catalana Internacional
2nd Banyoles
 UCI XCC World Cup
3rd Les Gets
2020
 Copa Catalana Internacional
1st Barcelona
2nd Banyoles
 UCI XCC World Cup
2nd Nové Město
2021
 1st  Short track, National Championships
 UCI XCO World Cup
1st Albstadt
1st Lenzerheide
 UCI XCC World Cup
1st Snowshoe
2nd Albstadt
3rd Lenzerheide
 French Cup
1st Lons-le-Saunier
1st Marseille
 Copa Catalana Internacional
1st Banyoles
1st Barcelona
 Internazionali d’Italia Series
2nd Andora
 3rd  Cross-country, UCI World Championships

Road
2022
 1st Stage 3 Alpes Isère Tour

References

External links

French male cyclists
Cross-country mountain bikers
Living people
Olympic cyclists of France
Cyclists at the 2016 Summer Olympics
1994 births
Sportspeople from Béziers
Cyclists at the 2020 Summer Olympics
Cyclo-cross cyclists
Cyclists from Occitania (administrative region)
French mountain bikers